The Captain Morgan Trophy was a knock-out trophy introduced by the Rugby League for season 1973-74. It was scrapped after only one season.

Background 
The Captain Morgan Trophy was a knock-out trophy introduced by the Rugby League supposedly intended to fill an “Imaginary” void in the season's fixture list. 
The competition was introduced for the season 1973-1974, but failed to catch the imagination of the public, or the clubs themselves and only took place for the one single season. 
The competition was sponsored by the House of Seagram, makers at that time of Captain Morgan Rum. (Note - This product is now produced by Diageo plc.),

The Captain Morgan Trophy competition had slightly different qualification and draw rules, as follows :-
1) Qualification for the competition was open to:- 
a)	the eight winners of the first round of the Yorkshire County cup
b)	The seven winners of the first round of the Lancashire county cup and because there were only fifteen teams in the Lancashire competition, the Lancashire team losing in the first round by the smallest margin. 
c)        The idea of this arrangement was to eliminate some of the “lesser” or “poorer” teams from the competition, thus reducing the number of games which are very one sided. This objective was somewhat defeated after teams like St. Helens, Hull F.C. and Hull Kingston Rovers failed to gain entry. 
2)  In addition to this, for the first round the draw kept the Yorkshire sides apart from those on the West of the Pennines (i.e. those in Lancashire and Cumberland) 
3)  The two sets of teams were all brought together for the subsequent rounds.

The first and only final was held at The Willows in Salford, on 26 January 1974. Warrington defeated Featherstone Rovers 4-0 in front of a disappointing crowd of only 5,269.
The "Man of the Match" award was won by Derek Whitehead.
The Warrington team was Derek Whitehead, Mick Philbin, Derek Noonan, Frank Reynolds, John Bevan, Alan Whittle, Parry Gordon, Dave Chisnall, Kevin Ashcroft, Brian Brady, Bobby Wanbon, David Wright, Ian Mather, with substitutes Billy Pickup (not used) and Joe Price. (Alex Murphy was injured)
The Featherstone Rovers team included Harold Box and John "Keith" Bridges.

Competition and Results

Round 1

Round 2

Round 3 - Semi Finals

Round 4 - Final

Notes and comments 

1  --  Wigan scorer - John Gray 2 goals

2  --  Warrington scores - Derek Whitehead 5 goals; Alex Murphy 1 dg; a n other 1 dg 

3  --  Widnes scorers - Barry Sheridan 1 try, Ray Dutton 3 goals

4  --  Widnes entered the competition as the loser by the smallest margin in the Lancashire Cup first round (after losing away at Salford by 12 points to 11) 

5  --  Warrington scores - Tommy Conroy, Brian Brady and Dave Cunliffe each scored a try, Derek Whitehead 3 goals 

6  --  Warrington scores - Kevin Ashcroft and Parry Gordon each scored a try, Derek Whitehead 5 goals, Kevin Ashcroft and Alex Murphy each 1 dg 

7  --  Warrington scores - Derek Whitehead 2 goals 

8  --  Derek Whitehead was presented with an 80oz magnum bottle of Captain Morgan Rum as winner of the man of the match award.

See also 
British rugby league system
1973–74 Northern Rugby Football League season
Cumberland League
Rugby league county cups
List of defunct rugby league clubs

References

External links
Saints Heritage Society
Cherry and White - Wigan Fan Site season 1973-74
Hull&Proud Fixtures & Results season 1973-74
Widnes Vikings - One team, one passion Season In Review - 1973-74
Warrington Wolves Archives 1973
Warrington Wolves Archives 1974

1973 in rugby league
1974 in English rugby league
1973 in England